Morgan Edwards (May 9, 1722 – January 25, 1792) was an American historian of religion, Baptist pastor, notable for his teaching on the 'rapture' before its popularization by John Nelson Darby (1800–1882).

Biography
Edwards was born in Trevethin parish, Pontypool, Wales, and attended Bristol College, after which he began preaching in 1738. He pastored several small Baptist churches in England for seven years, then moved to Ireland, where he pastored for nine years. In May 1761 he emigrated to the American colonies, and became pastor of the First Baptist Church in Philadelphia, Pennsylvania. He was one of the few Baptist clergyman to side with the Tories in the American Revolution.

Edwards was a friend to the Academy of Philadelphia, afterwards the University of Pennsylvania, which in 1769 honored him with an honorary Master of Arts.

Edwards resigned as pastor of the First Baptist Church in Philadelphia in 1771 and retired to Pencader Hundred, near Newark, Delaware where he lived until his death in 1795. His grave is located at the Mount Moriah Cemetery in Philadelphia, Pennsylvania.

Works
Edwards was a Baptist historian.  He wrote the first Baptist church manual in the United States titled "Customs of Primitive Churches".  His major work, Materials Toward A History of the Baptists (1770) is an important source describing the Baptists in America. He later wrote a companion volume, Materials Toward A History of the Baptists in New Jersey (1792)

In his Materials for a History of the Baptists in Rhode Island, Edwards wrote:
"The first mover [himself] for it [a Baptist college]  in 1762 was laughed at as a projector of a thing impracticable. Nay, many of the Baptists themselves discouraged the design (prophesying evil to the churches in case it should take place) from an unhappy prejudice against learning."

Brown University
In 1764, Edwards joined The Reverend James Manning, The Reverend Ezra Stiles, the Reverend Isaac Backus, the Reverend John Gano, the Reverend Samuel Stillman, William Ellery, and former Royal Governors Stephen Hopkins and Samuel Ward and several others as an original trustee for the chartering of the College in the English Colony of Rhode Island and Providence Plantations (the former name for Brown University), the first Baptist college in the original Thirteen Colonies and one of the Ivy League universities.

Pretribulationism
Edwards is notable for his early pretribulationism, predating John Nelson Darby (1800–1882) and popularization of the idea of Pretribulationism (the view that Christian believers will be raptured or translated to heaven with Christ before the events of the tribulation).

Personal life
His wife, formerly Mary Nunn of Cork, Ireland died in 1769.

Bibliography

References

1722 births
1795 deaths
Baptist ministers from the United States
18th-century Welsh Baptist ministers
People of colonial Pennsylvania
Brown University people
University and college founders
Clergy in the American Revolution
American historians of religion
People from Pontypool
English emigrants
Burials at Mount Moriah Cemetery (Philadelphia)